Moslem Al Freej (born 8 April 1988) is a Saudi professional footballer who plays as a goalkeeper for Pro League side Al-Fayha.

References

External links 
 

1988 births
Living people
Khaleej FC players
Al-Taraji Club players
Al-Fayha FC players
Saudi Arabian footballers
Saudi First Division League players
Saudi Professional League players
Association football goalkeepers
Saudi Arabian Shia Muslims